Santa Filomena is a city  in the state of Pernambuco, Brazil. The population in 2020, according with IBGE was 14,562 inhabitants and the total area is 1005.06 km².

Geography

 State - Pernambuco
 Region - Sertão Pernambucano
 Boundaries - Ouricuri   (N);  Dormentes   (S);  Santa Cruz  (E);  Piaui state  (W)
 Area - 1005.06 km²
 Elevation - 630 m
 Hydrography - Brigida and Garças rivers
 Vegetation - Caatinga
 Climate - semi arid- hot and dry
 Annual average temperature - 23.9 c
 Distance to Recife - 717 km

Economy

The main economic activity in Santa Filomena is agribusiness, especially farming of cattle, sheep, pigs, goats, donkeys, chickens;  and plantations of manioc and beans.

Economic Indicators

Economy by Sector
2006

Health Indicators

References

Municipalities in Pernambuco